Gradignan is a commune in the Gironde department in southwestern France.

It is a suburb of the city of Bordeaux and is located on its southwest side. Thus, it is a member of the Bordeaux Métropole.

Population

Education institutions 
Gradignan is a part of the Bordeaux education zone (Académie de Bordeaux).

Prison
Gradignan prison is a high-security facility serving the Bordeaux area.

International relations 
Gradignan has partnerships with:
  Pfungstadt, Germany, since 1996.
  Figueira da Foz, Portugal, since 1992.

Localities
Communes of the Gironde department
Motte Saint-Albe

References

External links

 Official website

Communes of Gironde